The Mausoleum of Shah Ali Akbar is a  mausoleum in Suraj Miani Multan, in Punjab province, Pakistan. 

Shah Ali Akbar is a descendant of Shah Shams Sabzwari and the grandson of Shah Shams. It is a mini version of Mausoleum of Shah Rukne Alam. It is octagonal in shape.

History of Multan
Buildings and structures in Multan